Hromnice is a municipality and village in Plzeň-North District in the Plzeň Region of the Czech Republic. It has about 1,300 inhabitants.

Administrative parts
Villages of Chotiná, Kostelec, Nynice, Planá and Žichlice are administrative parts of Hromnice.

References

Villages in Plzeň-North District